The World Tomorrow or World Tomorrow can refer to:

 World Tomorrow, 2012 political talk show, hosted by Julian Assange
 The World Tomorrow (radio and television), Christian radio and television program
 The World Tomorrow (magazine), American political magazine, 1918–1934

See also

 SciTech - Our World Tomorrow, a TV series
 World of Tomorrow (disambiguation)
 Tomorrow's World (disambiguation)
 Future World (disambiguation)
 Tomorrowland (disambiguation)